Gardenia actinocarpa is a rare and endangered plant in the madder family Rubiaceae that grows in a very restricted area within the Wet Tropics rainforest of north-east Queensland.

Description

They have a long attenuate (tapering) base and an extended "drip tip".

The calyx tube is green, coriaceous, and has six external longitudinal ridges extending into the laterally compressed calyx lobes.

Phenology
Flowering occurs from November to June and fruits mature from February to November. This species is dioecious (male and female flowers produced on separate plants) with little variation in size between the two sexes.

Taxonomy
Gardenia actinocarpa was described by the Australian botanist C.F. Puttock from samples collected by Geoff Tracey and Leonard Webb in 1973 from Oliver Creek, near Cape Tribulation, Queensland. Puttock's paper was published in Austrobaileya, the annual journal of the Queensland Herbarium, in 1988.

Etymology
The species epithet actinocarpa derives from Ancient Greek ἀκτίς (aktī́s), meaning "ray" and καρπός (karpós), meaning fruit. It refers to the star-shaped cross-section of the fruit.

Distribution and habitat
This rare species is found in a very restricted range, consisting of rainforested alluvial lowlands  in a single watershed of the Daintree rainforest. A study published in 2001 has suggested that this is a relatively new species which is still expanding its range.

Conservation
G. actinocarpa is classified as endangered under the Australian Government's Environment Protection and Biodiversity Conservation Act 1999 and the Nature Conservation Act 1992 of Queensland. Threats facing the species include the potential fragmentation of its habitat, limited female fecundity (when compared with related species), rapid loss of seed viability, and geographical barriers.

, it has not been assessed by IUCN.

Gallery

References

External links
 
 
 See a map of recorded sightings of  Gardenia actinocarpa at the Australasian Virtual Herbarium
 See a map of recorded sightings of Gardenia actinocarpa on iNaturalist.

actinocarpa
Endemic flora of Queensland
Taxa named by Christopher Francis Puttock
Dioecious plants